Louis Henri Pelouze (September 10, 1863 – January 9, 1939) was a Major League Baseball outfielder. In 1 career game, he had 0 hits in 3 at-bats. He batted and threw right-handed.

Pelouze was born in Fort Monroe, Virginia and died in New York, New York.

External links

1863 births
1939 deaths
St. Louis Maroons players
Major League Baseball outfielders
London Cockneys players
Baseball players from Norfolk, Virginia
19th-century baseball players